Theodora Morse (July 11, 1883 — November 10, 1953) was an American song writer and composer.
She was a Tin Pan Alley lyricist who collaborated to produce a number of popular songs.

Background
Alfreda Theodora Strandberg was born in Brooklyn, New York.  On March 7, 1907, she married Theodore F. Morse (1873–1924).  She and her husband became a successful songwriting team for Tin Pan Alley.  Listed as Terriss & Morse, they were one of the earliest Tin Pan Alley husband-wife songwriting teams.

Career

Theodora not only wrote with her husband, but also collaborated with other composers. Professionally, she often used the pseudonyms of Dorothy Terriss, Dolly Morse and D. A. Esrom. 
She wrote the lyrics for Hail, Hail, the Gang's All Here  to a tune originally written by Arthur Sullivan for the comic opera The Pirates of Penzance. The popular good-night waltz Three O'Clock in the Morning was written to music composed by Julián Robledo. The song was recorded in 1922 by Paul Whiteman and his orchestra. Jazz and pop standard, Wonderful One, was written by Paul Whiteman and Ferde Grofé, with lyrics by Theodora Morse based on a theme by movie director Marshall Neilan.

Theodora Morse  died in White Plains, NY.

Selected works
Hail, Hail, the Gang's All Here (1917)
Soldier Boy (1915) 
Three O'Clock in the Morning (1921)
Wonderful One (1922)

References

External links
The Composers of Tin Pan Alley

1953 deaths
Musicians from Brooklyn
American lyricists
American women composers
Songwriters from New York (state)
American people of Swedish descent
20th-century American women musicians
20th-century American composers
20th-century women composers